Yumnam Sanathoi Devi is an Indian Wushu player, martial artist and athlete. She was awarded the Arjuna Award by the Ministry of Youth Affairs and Sports, Government of India in 2015 for Wushu. She won a bronze medal at the 2014 Incheon Asian Games. She also won a bronze medal in the 2014 World Cup held at Indonesia and a silver medal in World Championships in 2011 and 2013. She won the bronze medal in the 13th World Wushu Championships in November 2015.  In 2016, Devi won a silver for India in 52 kg category at the 8th Sanda World Cup,  held at Xian, China.

She hails from Yairipok Top Chingtha village in Thoubal district of Manipur, India.  She took up traditional Chinese martial arts Wushu in 2003 under the guidance of Maibam Surbala Devi and later under Moirangthem Ibomcha Meitei.

Awards 
She was awarded by the Government of India , the prestigious Arjuna Award in 2015.

References 

Indian sanshou practitioners
Indian female martial artists
Indian women boxers
Living people
Indian martial arts
Recipients of the Arjuna Award
Asian Games medalists in wushu
Wushu practitioners at the 2010 Asian Games
Wushu practitioners at the 2014 Asian Games
Wushu practitioners at the 2018 Asian Games
Asian Games bronze medalists for India
Medalists at the 2014 Asian Games
1989 births